Zonosaurus brygooi, Brygoo's girdled lizard, is a species of lizard in the family Gerrhosauridae. The species is endemic to Madagascar.

References

Zonosaurus
Reptiles of Madagascar
Endemic fauna of Madagascar
Reptiles described in 1990